Milovan Stepandić (December 18, 1954 – January 15, 2020) was a Serbian professional basketball coach.

Coaching career
Stepandić coached Budućnost, Iva Zorka Šabac, Borac Čačak and NIS Vojvodina of the YUBA League.

On July 30, 2004, Stepandić became a head coach for the Swisslion Vršac.

From 2009 to 2013, Stepandić had three stints with Metalac of the Basketball League of Serbia.

References

External links
Coach Profile at eurobasket.com
Coach Profile at bgbasket.com

1954 births
2020 deaths
KK Budućnost coaches
KK FMP (1991–2011) coaches
KK Lavovi 063 coaches
KK Lions/Swisslion Vršac coaches
KK Metalac coaches
KK Srem coaches
KK Borac Čačak coaches
KK Vojvodina Srbijagas coaches
OKK Beograd coaches
OKK Šabac coaches
KK
Serbian men's basketball coaches
Serbian men's basketball players
Serbian expatriate basketball people in Croatia
Serbian expatriate basketball people in Montenegro
Sportspeople from Šabac
Yugoslav basketball coaches
Yugoslav men's basketball players